Hormaphis is a genus of witch hazel and palm aphids in the family Aphididae. There are at least three described species in Hormaphis, found mainly in eastern North America.

Species
These three species belong to the genus Hormaphis:
 Hormaphis betulae (Mordvilko, 1901)
 Hormaphis cornu (Shimer, 1867)
 Hormaphis hamamelidis (Fitch, 1851) (witch hazel cone gall aphid)

References

Further reading

 
 

Aphids
Taxa named by Carl Robert Osten-Sacken